Forum Copenhagen is a large multi-purpose, rentable indoor arena located in Frederiksberg, Denmark. It hosts a large variety of concerts, markets, exhibitions and other events. The venue can hold up to 10,000 people depending on the event. The Forum operates as a convention center, concert hall and indoor arena.

It was opened in February 1926 to host a car exhibition and was last renovated in 1996–97. Over two storeys there is a combined exhibition floor area of 5,000 m2> and a separate restaurant for up to 250 seated guests. The Metro station Forum is adjacent to the building.

History

On August 11, 1925, the construction committee signed the contract to build the venue. On 25 September 1925, Prime Minister Thorvald Stauning laid the foundation stone for the construction. Forum opened for the first time on February 20, 1926, for this year's major automotive exhibition. Forum Copenhagen was designed by Oscar Gundlach-Pedersen, and the lighting was from Poul Henningsen's brand new PH-lamp.

In 1929 it held an architecture exhibition, which was one of the first presentations of functionalism in Denmark, namely the Housing and Building Exhibition in Forum. It was at this exhibition that Arne Jacobsen and Flemming Lassen exhibited their subscription to the cylindrical "House of the Future".

During World War II, the Danish resistance movement group Holger Danske destroyed the original hall in an act of sabotage in August 1943. The hall was first rebuilt and extended in 1947. An annual six-day bicycle race was originally held here and was later moved to Ballerup Super Arena. In 1997, the Forum concluded an extensive renovation of the roof costing 70 million DKK, resulting in better acoustic sound and more concerts.

Concerts and events
The venue has hosted numerous music acts since its opening.

List of events

Esports 
On 22nd–24th of July 2022, the arena plays host for the playoff games of the 2022 Valorant Champions Tour: Stage 2 Masters, in which it hosts the Semifinals and the Grand Finals with live audience, making it the first international Valorant Esports event to be held with live audience.

See also
List of indoor arenas in Denmark
List of indoor arenas in Nordic countries

References

External links

Official website 
Official website 

Buildings and structures completed in 1926
Event venues established in 1926
Buildings and structures in Copenhagen
Culture in Copenhagen
Indoor arenas in Denmark
Music venues in Copenhagen
Convention centres in Denmark
Concert halls in Copenhagen
Rebuilt buildings and structures